Behnia is a genus of flowering plants. In the APG III classification system, it is placed in the family Asparagaceae, subfamily Agavoideae (formerly the family Agavaceae). There is only one known species, Behnia reticulata, native to southern Africa (Malawi, Mozambique, Zimbabwe, South Africa and Eswatini).

References

Monotypic Asparagaceae genera
Agavoideae
Flora of Africa